Liu Xie (ca. 465–522), courtesy name Yanhe, was a Chinese monk, politician, and writer. He was the author of China's greatest work of literary aesthetics, The Literary Mind and the Carving of Dragons (文心雕龍). His biography is included in the Liangshu.

Life 
A native of today's Zhenjiang, Liu's traced his ancestry to Shandong. He was orphaned in his youth and chose not to marry, either because of poverty or conviction (or both). Liu studied Buddhism with Sengyou and helped edit sutras at the Dinglin Monastery until his death during the Liang Dynasty.  It was during his time editing Buddhist scriptures that he wrote his The Literary Mind and the Carving of Dragons.

He later became a private secretary to Xiao Hong, brother of the Liang emperor Xiao Yan.  He also did logistics for a military unit and was later promoted to county magistrate in Taimo (modern day Longyou county, Zhejiang province).  Eventually, he again worked as a secretary to the emperor's other sons, until he was later sent back to the monastery.  When the scripture editing project was finished, Liu decided to continue on at the monastery.

Liu also wrote The Great Enlightenment (Hong Ming Ji) and On the World (Shijie Ji), both of which are lost.  He also wrote an essay entitled "Treatise on Refuting Falsehood" (Mie Huo Lun).

Psychology experiment
Liu Xie conducted a psychology experiment by asking his subjects to draw a circle on a piece of paper with one hand, while the other hand tried to simultaneously draw a square. This test was to measure the level of distraction that could be managed by his subjects. As Liu observed, his students, who were the subjects of his experiment, struggled to perform both tasks simultaneously. What Liu's experiment had demonstrated was that by doing two experiments at once will mean that neither experiment is done correctly.

References

 Yang, Mingzhao, "Liu Xie". Encyclopedia of China (Chinese Literature Edition), 1st ed.

External links
 

Year of birth unknown
Year of death unknown
Chinese spiritual writers
Liang dynasty Buddhist monks
Liang dynasty politicians
Liang dynasty writers
Liu Song dynasty people
Politicians from Zhenjiang
Southern Qi Buddhists
Writers from Zhenjiang
Rhetoricians